Roji Mullanmadakkal John, (born 20 May 1984), is a Member of Kerala Legislative Assembly representing, Angamaly constituency in Ernakulam district. He is an Indian politician from Ernakulam, Kerala and a member of the Indian National Congress.	
Roji was elected as a member of the Legislative Assembly of Kerala from Angamaly in 2016 and again re elected  in 2021. Roji has also served as the president of the NSUI, the National students wing of The Indian National Congress.

Biography
 
Roji is the son of Mullanmadakkal John hailing from Ayiroor in Angamaly. After completing his basic education, Roji joined the Sacred Heart College, Thevara for higher studies. He was an activist with Kerala Students Union during college. He was elected as the Chairman of S H College, Thevara in 2001. After his bachelor's degree, Roji shifted to Hyderabad for his master's degree at University of Hyderabad and then to Delhi and was elected as the councilor of JNU students union in 2005.

He was elected to JNU NSUI secretary post in 2006. He was further elected as the JNU NSUI Vice president in 2008. Roji was in charge of volunteering various organizational activities for the NSUI. In 2009, Roji was appointed the member of Central Election Authority of NSUI. While in NSUI, Roji was given the task of conducting organisational elections in several states. Taking charge as the National Vice President of the NSUI in 2011, he was in charge of the Organisational Elections and Unit Management.

On 6 August 2014, Roji was elected as the national president of National Students Union of India, the student wing of the Congress. He also became the first person to be elected to the post after Rahul Gandhi introduced the system of election of office bearers. He won the election with 36 of 62 office bearers of NSUI voting in his favour. The 34 state presidents and 28 national office bearers of NSUI across the country, who had the voting right, were a part of election process. Congress President Smt. Sonia Gandhi appointed Roji as the AICC Secretary in Charge of Karnataka on June 10, 2022.

References

Kerala MLAs 2016–2021
Indian National Congress politicians from Kerala
Living people
People from Angamaly
Politicians from Kochi
1982 births
National Students' Union of India